LHK Jestřábi Prostějov is an ice hockey team in Prostějov, Czech Republic. They play in the Czech 1. Liga, the second level of ice hockey in the Czech Republic.
The club was founded as Sportovní Klub Prostějov in 1913.

Achievements
Czech 2.liga champion: 1999, 2005, 2014.
Tatra Cup champion: 1932, 1946, 1952.

External links
 Official site

Prostějov 
Sport in Prostějov
1913 establishments in Austria-Hungary
Ice hockey clubs established in 1913